Commute.org (formally the Peninsula Traffic Congestion Relief Alliance) is the transportation demand management (TDM) agency for San Mateo County, California, United States. Structured as a public joint powers agency, Commute.org is governed by an 18-member board made up of elected officials from 17 member cities and towns as well as the County of San Mateo. In addition to the Board of Directors, there are also standing committees, Supervisory and Finance, which provide guidance and oversight to the agency. 

Commute.org's programs, which it promotes through employer relationships as well as directly to commuters, “focus on reducing single occupancy vehicle travel in San Mateo County, particularly during peak commute hours.” The agency receives funding from the City/County Association of Governments of San Mateo County (C/CAG), the San Mateo County Transportation Authority, the Bay Area Air Quality Management District and the Metropolitan Transportation Commission. 

As of 2019, Commute.org is certified as a Green Business and a Best Workplaces for Commuters.

Background
Commute.org was founded in 2000. In 2016, the agency launched STAR (Support, Track and Reward), a web-based platform for managing commuter trip data and rewards, powered by the company RideAmigos. At the end of fiscal year 2019 there were over 12,000 commuters with STAR accounts, and a cumulative 700,000 trips had been logged on the platform since its launch. 

In March 2014, the Metropolitan Transportation Commission ratified Regulation 14, Rule 1, also known as the Bay Area Commuter Benefits Program. The Commuter Benefits Program, developed by the Bay Area Air Quality Management District, requires Bay Area employers with 50 or more full-time employees to register and offer commuter benefits to their employees. One of Commute.org's roles is assisting employers in complying with the regulation.

Other local projects that intersect with Commute.org's congestion reduction work include Caltrain electrification, the Highway 101 Managed Lanes project, and SamTrans’ Express Bus service.

Programs
Commute.org manages a wide range of TDM programs, including working with employers as well as directly incentivizing and rewarding commuters.

Employer services include offering information, tools, consulting, commute surveying, and bike safety workshops for employers of all types, including schools, non-profits, government agencies, and private companies. This is in part to help employers achieve compliance with the Bay Area Commuter Benefits Program.

Commute.org’s commuter programs, which it manages through its web-based platform STAR, include Carpool 2.0 carpool rewards, the Vanpool Incentive Program, Bicycle to Work Rewards, Try Transit free transit tickets, Guaranteed Ride Home, and quarterly challenges.

Every spring, Commute.org sponsors the San Mateo County Commuter Challenge. The challenge takes place throughout the months of April and May and encourages people to try alternative methods of commuting through widespread outreach efforts as well as weekly and grand prize raffle prizes for participating commuters. The challenge coincides with the annual Bay Area Bike to Work Day in May, which Commute.org coordinates for San Mateo County.

Shuttle Service
Commute.org manages 20 shuttle routes that provide first/last mile transportation between transit stations and worksites in San Mateo County. The shuttles are operated by MV Transportation and the program is funded through a combination of grants from agencies and funds from private employers, property managers, and sponsoring cities. Grant providers include the Bay Area Air Quality Management District, City/County Association of Governments of San Mateo County (C/CAG), San Mateo County Transportation Authority, and SamTrans.

Routes

References

Transportation in San Mateo County, California
Government of San Mateo County, California